KFM was an unlicensed radio station based in Stockport, Greater Manchester, United Kingdom.

History
KFM originally broadcast on 94.2 MHz FM from a studio on Middle Hillgate, Stockport with the transmitter and aerial at Goyt Mill in Marple from November 1983 to February 1985. Its name on the business board was Mersey Valley Electronics. KFM was functional by 1984 with a day-time line-up including DJ's 'Jumpin' Johnny Owen, Dave Starr, Pete Wilde, Simon Richards, Pete Smith, Jon Guy, Craig Wood, Philip Gorman, Big Al Rockwell, Pete Best, 'Dodgy' Kevin Webb, Steve Maltby, Rob Charles, 'Naughty' Nikki Stevens and Stevie 'Megamix' King (with Wilf the Weatherman), Roger Taylor and Captain Flint.  The station was raided by the authorities several times, but was soon back on air each time.

Although a pirate radio station, KFM broadcast test transmissions for a number of weeks prior to going live and was featured more than once on Granada Television's "Granada Reports" news programme. The original transmissions were in mono only but they rapidly moved to stereo output.

The station was created by Alastair Bates and Charles Turner, who both also presented weekend shows. Charles Turner had been involved in an unlicensed pirate radio station in the 1970s (a 'hippy' station called Radio Aquarius), and Alastair Bates and Ian Walsh in the early 1980s in a Manchester station called RFM. Charles Turner used a frequency synthesiser transmitter of his own design and a stereo encoder designed by Trevor Brooks (published in Wireless World in the early 1980s). Phil Platt sang on the early KFM jingles which were written by Charles Turner with the input of Phil and Steve Ridgeway.  Other jingles were produced by AlphaSound.

The first broadcasts were test transmissions from pub car parks and the tops of local hills such as Werneth Low and Lantern Wood near Bowstonegate Farm in Higher Disley. Transmissions from Middle Hillgate and Goyt Mill came much later; the earliest broadcasts preceded 1983.  The first broadcasts were transmitted from a radio mast at Bowstonegate Farm in Lyme Park. They were initially 2 hours long, pre-recorded at Ride Music Studio's and other secret locations on to a Revox B77 reel-to-reel tape recorder, then transferred to the boot of a car which was then parked at a pub car park near Disley.  The broadcast of only two hours at a time made it difficult for government departments to trace the transmitter.

The station had a mix of national and local music and its following grew rapidly. On weekdays it had an hourly news service (gathered from Ceefax pages).  The station changed its studio location to Goyt Mill, where the transmitter was based. KFM aggravated its local well-established competitor Piccadilly Radio. Programme Controller Colin Walters said in a documentary on Radio 4 that the station was "producing radio on the cheap" by not paying needle time, wages, standard business taxes, licensing fees etc. KFM was eventually taken off the air by a raid by the Department of Trade and Industry, which enforced the Wireless Telegraphy Act's prohibition on broadcasting without a licence.

One of KFM's early DJs and initial Programme Controller was Steve Toon, who also presented live music under the KFM aegis at the Brookfield Hotel along with Pete Best KFM's Saturday Morning DJ. After becoming licensed it was an indie music station of the late 1980s and early 1990s, and featured Terry Christian, Jon Ronson, Caroline Aherne, Neil Cossar, Joe Patricks, Spence MacDonnald and Craig Cash in its line up (although, with the exception of Joe Patricks and Craig Cash, none of these were actually at the station in its halcyon (unlicensed/'pirate' days). KFM's Rock show, presented by Simon Norton was sponsored by the country's biggest rock club, Rockworld in Manchester. 

Whilst an undergraduate at Manchester University, Adam Tickell (the now Vice-Chancellor of Sussex University) frequently worked alongside Charles Turner in the early days of the radio station. Charles taught Adam the basics of DJing and how to produce music which would lead Adam to perform at local club nights. Adam Tickell was not described as being a good DJ but was very eager to learn whose passion made his performances the best they could be. 

Despite critical acclaim in its legal days it failed commercially and Charles Turner sold the licence to Signal Radio. It became Signal Cheshire, ownership was transferred again, to UTV Radio, and  it broadcast as Imagine FM.
The KFM Radio name was revived in November 2014 with the launch of a brand new online station, www.kfmradio.co.uk designed and built in tribute to the original 1984 KFM. Designed to serve the people of Stockport and South Manchester and their friends and families all over the world, with a potential global reach on the World Wide Web. A multi genre station with some of the original 1984 team involved. It has since evolved streaming 24/7 and also has links with other online stations and listeners in many countries.

References

External links
 http://www.northwestradio.info/memories/kfm/
 http://www.robcharles.com
 http://www.phil-platt.com

Radio stations in Manchester
Defunct radio stations in the United Kingdom
Former pirate radio stations
Pirate radio stations in the United Kingdom
Radio stations established in 1983 
Radio stations disestablished in 1985